The Tomb of Murad I (also known as Meşhed-i Hüdâvendigâr) is a mausoleum (türbe) dedicated to the Ottoman Sultan Murad I located in the Prishtina District, Kosovo.

Murad I (nicknamed Hüdavendigâr, meaning the "God-liked one" or the "sovereign" in this context) was killed in the Battle of Kosovo in 1389. The monument was built in the 14th century by Murad I's son Bayezid I, becoming the first example of Ottoman architecture in the Kosovo territory. His internal organs were buried in Kosovo Polje and remain to this day in the tomb at the site. Murad's other remains were taken to Bursa, his Anatolian birthplace, and buried there in his second tomb at the Hüdavendigâr complex in Bursa.

The monument was mentioned by Evliya Çelebi in 1660. The tomb has gained a religious significance for the local Muslims.

Notes and references

Notes

References

External links

 Official site (Albanian/Turkish)

Murad
Ottoman Serbia
Ottoman period in the history of Kosovo
Ottoman mausoleums
Kosovo Polje